Oedematopoda is a genus of moths in the family Stathmopodidae. This genus is closely related to the genus Atkinsonia and tough to differentiate externally.

Species
Oedematopoda beijingana Yang, 1977
Oedematopoda bicoloricornis Strand, 1913
Oedematopoda butalistis Strand, 1917
Oedematopoda clerodendronella (Stainton, 1859)
Oedematopoda cypris Meyrick, 1905
Oedematopoda flammifera Meyrick, 1915
Oedematopoda ignipicta (Butler, 1881)
Oedematopoda illucens (Meyrick, 1914)
Oedematopoda leechi Walsingham, 1889
Oedematopoda nohirai Matsumura, 1931
Oedematopoda princeps (Zeller, 1852)
Oedematopoda pyromyia Meyrick, 1929
Oedematopoda semirubra Meyrick, 1936
Oedematopoda venusta (Meyrick, 1913)

References

Stathmopodidae
Moth genera